Eduardo Capetillo Vásquez (born April 13, 1970) is a Mexican actor and singer.

Life
He was born in Mexico City, Mexico. He belongs to the Capetillo family, who have a long tradition of being bullfighters.

Being still very young, he participated in some courses of preparation with the actress Martha Zabaleta and some courses of jazz in the center of qualification of Televisa. His career started when he won the festival Juguemos a Cantar, where he won the second place with the song Mi grupo toca Rock (My band plays rock), later launched by Orfeón Records.

He participated in the Spanish theatre version of Grease, Vaselina, and recorded his first telenovela in 1983 called Martín Garatuza.

In 1986, Eduardo entered Timbiriche, replacing Benny Ibarra. Success followed through Rock Shows, on Timbiriche VI album, and subsequently recording more hits with albums Timbiriche VII, Timbiriche VIII and Timbiriche lX. Capetillo sang various solos that became hits, such as No seas tan cruel, Todo Cambia, Con todos menos conmigo. He then toured Mexico and some Latin American countries.

In 1989, Capetillo left the group and began his career as a solo artist. In 1991 he sold more than a million copies of the album of five songs, sound track of the telenovela Alcanzar una estrella.

That same year he launched his album Dame Una Noche. In 1992 he returned as an actor and singer thanks to another telenovela, Baila conmigo, and to his second album, Estoy Aquí.

Later he released a new album, Piel Ajena (1995), and a career in which the formula is mixed actor-singer in telenovelas, that strengthens him as an idol in the Latin world thanks to titles like Marimar, together with Thalía, that was seen in more than 150 countries, or Canción De Amor, Camila or El secreto, in which he and Yadhira Carrillo are the only Mexican actors of a Spanish cast.

Thanks to the telenovela El secreto, seen on Spanish television (the TVE), Capetillo has returned to record a new album, with Horus-Muxxic, registered in diverse studios of Mexico and Spain, with a production directed and made by his brother-in-law Chacho Gaytán.
The album includes the hit song "El Secreto", the main theme of the telenovela, composed, arranged and produced by Federico Vaona in 2001–2002.
In 2003 he also interpreted one of the songs of the telenovela Bajo la misma piel.
In 2004 he appeared in Amy, la niña de la mochila azúl.
His most recent telenovela is Peregrina, a story of an 18-year-old circus girl who discovers her real family.

Capetillo is married to actress and singer Bibi Gaytán, his partner from the Timbiriche years. They have five children: Eduardo (born August 17, 1994), Ana Paula (born 1997), Alejandra (born 1999), Manuel and Daniel Capetillo (born June 20, 2014).

Telenovelas

References

External links
 Eduardo Capetillo on Myspace

1970 births
Living people
21st-century Mexican male singers
Mexican male child actors
Mexican male stage actors
Mexican male telenovela actors
Mexican people of Spanish descent
Mexican people of Basque descent
Male actors from Mexico City
Timbiriche members
Singers from Mexico City
20th-century Mexican male singers